Kordlar is a village in Bozkosh Rural District, in the Central District of Ahar County, East Azerbaijan Province, Iran. At the 2006 census, its population was 706, in 131 families.

References 

Populated places in Ahar County